Martorell is a municipality, county, and city that forms part of the Baix Llobregat comarca, in Catalonia, Spain, primarily known for its medieval Devil's bridge. It lies at the confluence of the Llobregat and Anoia rivers.

It has three railway stations - one on the Renfe line from Manresa to Sant Vicenç de Calders (via Barcelona and Vilafranca del Penedès) called "Martorell", and three on the FGC line from Barcelona to Manresa called "Martorell-Vila", "Martorell-Enllaç" and "Martorell-Central".

Martorell is home to the SEAT corporate headquarters and automobile factory, where the SEAT Ibiza, Leon, Arona and Audi A1 are manufactured.

Demography

Climate

References

 Panareda Clopés, Josep Maria; Rios Calvet, Jaume; Rabella Vives, Josep Maria (1989). Guia de Catalunya, Barcelona: Caixa de Catalunya.  (Spanish).  (Catalan).

External links
 Government data pages 

Municipalities in Baix Llobregat